Ali Akbar Bahman (also Mirza Ali Akbar Khan; 1883 – 1967) was an Iranian diplomat and politician during the Qajar and Pahlavi eras.

Family 
Ali Akbar Bahman was a member of the famous Bahmani-Qajar family. He was born in Tehran as Mirza Ali Akbar Khan in 1883, and died there in 1967. He descended from the family of Prince Bahman Mirza Qajar, son of Abbas Mirza. Bahman Mirza (1810-1884) was governor-general of Azerbaijan, and prince-regent for his ill brother Mohammad Shah and the infant crown prince Nasir al-Din. After Bahman Mirza fell out of favour at court he went into exile to the Russian Caucasus. His eldest son Prince Anoushiravan Mirza (1833-1899) returned to Iran, and had a daughter called Princess Malekeh Afagh Khanom (1863 - 26 October 1917), Ali Akbar Bahman's mother. His father was Mirza Hossein Behnam from an aristocratic family from Tabriz, which served the royal house since the days of Fath Ali Shah. Because of his father's early death in 1897 his mother married secondly Amanollah Khan entitled Zia' os-Soltan (lit. "Splendour of the Sovereign") from the Donboli family, her maternal cousin, who was a big landowner at Tabriz, and notable at court. His stepfather, a politician in the Iranian constitutional movement, encouraged young Ali Akbar in his career and introduced him to several political figures of that time like Yahya Dowlatabadi.
In 1931, when family names were mandated in Iran, Ali Akbar and his siblings Ali Asghar and Nosrat ol-Molouk Khanom named their family Bahman in honor of their grandfather Prince Bahman Mirza.

Career 
From noble birth with his mother a royal princess, the young Mirza Ali Akbar Khan had every chance to make a career at court. Thus, he was occupied in the administration service. His stepfather was a staunch opponent to absolutism and open to reforms, thus he supported the Constitutional Movement of 1906. His companion Yahya Dowlatabadi, a leading left-winged constitutional politician and reformist of the Iranian school system sent Mirza Ali Akbar Khan in 1907 to Russian Azerbaijan to teach at the Persian Sa'adat-School at Baku. There, a lot of Ali Akbar's relatives from his mother's family lived.

After the Russian Revolution and World War I many Persians from the Caucasus tried to escape from the Red Army to Iran. With his family ties in Azerbaijan and Iran, Ali Akbar Bahman was able to help refugees cross the border. On 26 August 1919 Ali Akbar was appointed Envoy Extraordinary and Minister Plenipotentiary of Persia to Bucharest, and then in 1921 ambassador to Belgium. From 1934 to 1935 he was Iran's Ambassador to Afghanistan, and in 1935 arranged the "Atabay Arbitration" (territorial exchanges between both countries in the Sistan-Zabulistan region).  
In 1935 he also became Minister of Transport and with seven other members of the cabinet responsible for the 1935 commemoration stamp set.  Finally 1939-1943 he became ambassador to Egypt. There he arranged the marriage of Mohammad Reza Pahlavi (in those days Crown Prince of Iran) with Princess Fawzia, daughter of King Fouad I and sister of King Farouk of Egypt on 16 March 1939 in the Abdeen Palace at Cairo.

Back in Iran from Egypt, where he also headed a gathering of Iranians at the embassy about Iranian Settlement in Egypt and participated in the Cairo Conference 1943, Ali Akbar Bahman became sometimes Minister for Trade 1944-1946. He bought the Gowharshad residence in Tehran and a huge garden area of Bagh-e Mostowfi, in the city's cosy north at the slopes of Alburz Mountains. Ali Akbar Bahman died in 1967 and was buried next to his mother's mausoleum in the Shah-Abdol-Azim shrine, Tehran.

Ali Akbar Bahman married Zoleykha Khanom Gadjieva and issued one daughter, Mehr-e Jahan (Mehri) Khanom Bahman.

References

Bibliography
'Aqeli, Baqer: "Ali Akbar Batman, in: Sharhe-e hal-e rejal-e siyassi va nezami-ye mo'asser-e Iran (Biography of the contemporary dignitaries of policy and military in Iran), Vol. I, Nashr-e goftar, Tehran 2001, pp. 325-326.
Clayton, Sir Gilbert: An Arabian Dictionary, edit. by Robert O. Collins, University of California Press, Berkeley and Los Angeles 1969.

Kadjar, Soltan Ali Mirza: "Mohammad Ali Shah: The Man and the King", in: Qajar Studies, Vol VII, Barjesteh van Waalwijk van Doorn, Rotterdam 2007, pp. 177–195.
Kasravi, Ahmad: Tarikh-e Mashruteh-ye Iran (History of the Constitutional Revolution in Iran), Vol. I, Amir Kabir, Tehran 2537 imperial calendar.

1883 births
1967 deaths
Iranian diplomats
20th-century Iranian politicians
Ambassadors of Iran to Egypt
Ambassadors of Iran to Belgium
Bahmani family